is a party video game developed by Hudson Soft and published by Nintendo for the Game Boy Advance. Released in 2005, it is the first handheld game in the Mario Party series, and differs from other titles in that the game is mostly single-player. Mario Party Advance was followed by Mario Party DS for the Nintendo DS in 2007, and was re-released on the Wii U Virtual Console in 2014.

Gameplay 

The player can choose from four different Mario characters: Mario, Luigi, Princess Peach, and Yoshi. The player drives a car around a party board, similar to those seen in the previous Mario Party games. Depending on the character chosen, the player will start at a different area on the board. The player starts with four Mushrooms. Additional Mushrooms are earned by winning minigames that are played every three turns. The game is over when there are no Mushrooms left. The multiplayer Party Mode that was present in all of the previous Mario Party games is no longer available, and it has been replaced by a new mode called "Shroom City". The aim of the game is to collect all the minigames and "Gaddgets" that were scattered around Shroom City by Bowser, by completing quests assigned to the player by the various inhabitants of Shroom City.

Gaddgets, invented by Professor E. Gadd, are interactive items such as a Morse code generator and a love meter. The game includes over 120 minigames, including Gaddgets. Approximately 12 of the minigames can be played in multiplayer mode, with the use of a Game Link Cable. Certain Gaddgets can also be played in multiplayer mode if players control different buttons on a single Game Boy Advance system. The game also included a paper game board for multiple players that could be played in conjunction with the game cartridge, used by players to roll the dice and to play minigames.

Reception 

Mario Party Advance received "mixed" reviews according to the review aggregation website Metacritic.  In Japan, Famitsu gave it a score of three sevens and one six for a total of 27 out of 40.

While the game contains a large number of minigames and unlockables, reviewers criticized the game's tendency to punish players based on random chance, rebuked the game for lack of innovation in the minigames, and expressed concerns about the game's limited multiplayer modes. Craig Harris of IGN criticized the game's "incredibly basic and rudimentary graphic and sound presentation", as well as its "slowpaced" single-player mode, its large amount of dialogue, and wrote that most of its minigames "are actually on the bland side, featuring some rudimentary platform challenges or memory games that have been done a billion times before in other games. The 2D environment must have restricted the team's creativity in providing some challenges that are imaginative and fun." Frank Provo of GameSpot called the game's multiplayer modes "fairly limited and poorly organized", but said the single-player mode "is very nicely organized and offers a great deal of variety". Provo praised the "colorful" character sprites, but criticized the game's "bland" backgrounds and some of its minigames.

Kristan Reed of Eurogamer wrote that it was "practically the dictionary definition of awful", noting that "most - if not all - of its hundred odd mini games are among some of the most insultingly undemanding and badly-designed efforts you'll ever see associated with the beloved franchise". Reed said "a typical game within Mario Party Advance is often tedious, badly designed and completely lacking in any endearing qualities at all. [...] Animation is virtually non existent, the tedious chatty exchanges that take place between characters lacks any imagination at all and the whole project just smells like something thrown together to meet a contractual obligation". Karen Chu of 1UP.com wrote, "Though I'm open to new possibilities and reinterpretations of Mario Party, playing this game made me want to just jump on my Gamecube and play the original console versions -- even if I have to play against 3 CPU players because frankly, being the only player on a board game that's advertised as a party is just disheartening."

In 2015, IGN listed the game at the bottom of its list of "Best Mario Party Games", writing, "Mario Party Advance is the black sheep of the Mario Party series. This handheld version forwent the classic style of four players collecting stars and coins in favor of a single player focused mode. The heart of the Mario Party series lies in its multiplayer, so while this new approach brought a few interesting ideas, it never achieved what made all the other games so enticing."

Notes

References

External links 
  
 

Advance
2005 video games
Game Boy Advance games
Party video games
Video games developed in Japan
Virtual Console games
Virtual Console games for Wii U
Multiplayer video games